The R174 road is a regional road in Ireland linking Ravensdale and Jenkinstown  in County Louth. 

See also 

 Roads in Ireland
 National primary road
 National secondary road

References 

Regional roads in the Republic of Ireland
Roads in County Louth